Timofey Vladimirovich  Tribuntsev is a Russian actor. Winner of the Nika Award-2017."Лучшими актерами" "Ники" стали Высоцкая и Трибунцев

Biography
Timofey was born on July 1, 1973. He studied at the Mikhail Shchepkin Higher Theatre School'', after which he collaborated with various theaters and acted in films.

Selected filmography

References

External links 
 Timofey Tribuntsev on kino-teatr.ru

Russian male film actors
1973 births
Living people
Russian male television actors
Recipients of the Nika Award